David Brooks may refer to:

Writers
 David Brooks (commentator) (born 1961), commentator for The New York Times and other publications
 David Brooks (author) (born 1953), Australian author of short stories and co-editor of Southerly
 David H. M. Brooks (1950–1996), South African philosopher and professor of philosophy at the University of Cape Town

Arts
 Mavado (singer) (David Constantine Brooks, born 1981), Jamaican dancehall artist
 David Brooks, director of the 2012 film ATM
 Bubba Brooks (David Kenneth Brooks, Jr., 1922–2002), American jazz musician
 David Brooks (actor) (1915–1999), American actor and stage director and producer

Politics 

 David Brooks (American politician) (1756–1838), United States representative in the Fifth United States Congress
 David Brooks, 5th Baron Crawshaw (born 1934), British peer and politician
 David Brooks (Northern Irish politician), MLA from Belfast East

Sports
 David Brooks (rugby league) (born 1962), Australian rugby league footballer
 David Brooks (ice hockey) (born 1939), American ice hockey player
 David Brooks (rugby union) (1924–2002), British rugby union footballer
 David Brooks (footballer) (born 1997), Wales international footballer

Other
 David Owen Brooks (1955–2020), teenage accomplice of serial killer Dean Corll
 D. W. Brooks (David William Brooks, 1901–1999), American farmer and businessman
 David Brooks (inventor), inventor who patented an insulator for telegraph lines in 1867 while working for the Central Pacific Railroad

See also
 David Brook (disambiguation)
 David Brooke (disambiguation)